The common tree frog (Polypedates leucomystax) is a species in the shrub frog family, Rhacophoridae.

Common tree frog may also refer to:

 Common big-eyed tree frog (Nyctimystes narinosus), a frog in the family Hylidae endemic to Papua New Guinea
 Common Chinese tree frog (Hyla chinensis), a frog in the family Hylidae found in southeastern and eastern China and Taiwan
 Common forest tree frog (Leptopelis notatus), a frog in the family Hyperoliidae found in Angola, Cameroon, the Republic of the Congo, the Democratic Republic of the Congo, Equatorial Guinea, Gabon, Nigeria, and possibly the Central African Republic
 Common Indian tree frog (Polypedates maculatus), a frog in the family Rhacophoridae found in South Asia
 Common Mexican tree frog (Smilisca baudinii), a frog in the family Hylidae whose native range extends from the Sonoran Desert and the Lower Rio Grande Valley of Texas south to Costa Rica
 Hispaniolan common tree frog (Osteopilus dominicensis), a frog in the family Hylidae endemic to the Dominican Republic and Haiti

Animal common name disambiguation pages